St. Paul Catholic Church, also known as St. Paul on Salt River and Center Parish, is a historic Roman Catholic church located near Center, Ralls County, Missouri.  The church was built in 1860, and is a one-story, rectangular limestone building on a stone foundation. It measures 33 feet, 6 inches, by 58 feet, 8 inches and is topped by a gable roof with cupola.  It features lancet windows in the Gothic Revival style.

It was listed on the National Register of Historic Places in 1979.

References

Roman Catholic churches completed in 1860
Churches in the Roman Catholic Diocese of Jefferson City
Former Roman Catholic church buildings in Missouri
Churches on the National Register of Historic Places in Missouri
Gothic Revival church buildings in Missouri
Churches in Ralls County, Missouri
National Register of Historic Places in Ralls County, Missouri
19th-century Roman Catholic church buildings in the United States